Green Park Provincial Park is a provincial park in Prince Edward Island, Canada. It is located on the western shore of Malpeque Bay. It is the site of a former shipyard; in the 19th century, ship building was a major industry on Prince Edward Island. The province acquired the land in the 1960s. It is home to the Green Park Shipbuilding Museum and Yeo House, the historic home of a shipping magnate.

References

Provincial parks of Prince Edward Island
Parks in Prince County, Prince Edward Island